Geylang Bahru MRT station is an underground Mass Rapid Transit (MRT) station on the Downtown line in Kallang, Singapore.

The station is located under Kallang Bahru, at the junction with Geylang Bahru, hence its name. Nearby developments are largely residential. The Kallang Basin Swimming Complex and Kallang MRT station are located near to this station.

History
The station was first announced as Kallang Bahru station on 20 August 2010 when the 16 stations of the  Downtown line Stage 3 (DTL3) from the River Valley (now Fort Canning) to Expo stations were unveiled. The line was expected to be completed in 2017. Construction of the station and the tunnels commenced in July that year and was targeted to be completed in 2017.

The station opened on 21 October 2017, as announced by the Land Transport Authority on 31 May that year.

Station details

Design and artwork

The station's internal area features a design resembling a leaf. Artworks portraying objects from day-to-day activities are also placed all over the station, and are part of an installation called Constructed Memories, by Marianne Yang.

Facilities in the vicinity
The station is located near to Kallang Basin Swimming Complex, Kallang Basin Industrial Estate, Kallang station and Lorong 1 Geylang Bus Terminal.

References

External links

Railway stations in Singapore opened in 2017
Kallang
Mass Rapid Transit (Singapore) stations